Andrew Bagnall is a motor racing driver born in Wellington, New Zealand on 14 February 1947.

Career
Bagnall raced in the Australian Touring Car Championship in the late 1980s, in the New Zealand Touring Car Championship in 1990, and in some races of the 1997 and 1998 FIA GT Championship seasons. In 1999 he moved to the United States Road Racing Championship before filling in for other drivers in the American Le Mans Series for a few years. In 2004 he raced the full Australian Porsche Carrera Cup season.

Andrew Bagnall holds a Commerce Degree from Otago University. He was financed into his MBA from Michigan State University in 1973 by travel operator Atlantic & Pacific, where he went on to work for three years following his return. He then went on to establish Gullivers Travel Group which became the major distributor of wholesale and retail travel services in New Zealand. Gullivers Travel Group was eventually listed on the New Zealand and Australian stock exchanges (ASX) and was subsequently sold to ASX listed S8.

Bagnall was also involved in co-developing one of New Zealand’s first commercial retirement villages. Andrew now runs his own private investment company, Segoura, which manages investments in various businesses. Andrew is also a Director of PowerShield Limited.

Bagnall was a significant investor in Life Pharmacy Limited and following the merger with Pharmacybrands Limited (later renamed Green Cross Health Limited) has continued to hold a significant shareholding in the merged entity. Andrew was appointed as a Non-Executive Director of the Company in August 2009. With 354 pharmacies under the Unichem and Life Pharmacy brands along with 39 medical centres, 300 doctors and 340 nurses, Green Cross also has more than 20,000 clients through Access Community Health. However, the 2017/18 financial year was not a happy one owing to having to meet a pay equity shortfall, which reduced the annual profit by 15% to $16.8m on improved revenue of $522m.

As of (2012) he has an estimated net worth of NZ$125 million and owns a $US65 million Gulfstream G650 whilst living in a Herne Bay property with a rateable value of $18.5m.

Car Collection 
Bagnall is famous for his collection of exotic cars. Bagnall used to own the rarest model of the McLaren F1, the F1 HDF. In August 2019, it was auctioned by RM Sotheby's at Monterey Car Week in Monterey, California for a price of US$19.8 million (NZ$30.7 million). Among Bagnall's collection of hypercars is a 'magnesium silver' McLaren P1, and a red (Rosso Dubai) Pagani Huayra, both of which are the only cars of their kind in New Zealand. Bagnall also owns a 'Victory Grey' McLaren Senna.

Career results

Complete Australian Touring Car Championship results
(key) (Races in bold indicate pole position) (Races in italics indicate fastest lap)

Complete World Touring Car Championship results
(key) (Races in bold indicate pole position) (Races in italics indicate fastest lap)

† Not eligible for series points

Complete Asia-Pacific Touring Car Championship results
(key) (Races in bold indicate pole position) (Races in italics indicate fastest lap)

Complete 24 Hours of Le Mans results

Complete Bathurst 1000 results

Complete Bathurst 24 Hour results

Complete Bathurst 12 Hour results

References

 Driver Database profile
 Racing reference profile (USA Results)

1947 births
Living people
New Zealand racing drivers
24 Hours of Le Mans drivers
Australian Touring Car Championship drivers
World Touring Car Championship drivers
24 Hours of Spa drivers
Australian Endurance Championship drivers